Jack Ganzhorn (1881–1956) was a silent film actor and script writer of the 1920s and 1930s – primarily in silent film Westerns, Hawk of the Hills (1927 serial) and Fightin' Odds.

Family
John W. "Jack" Ganzhorn was born on March 21, 1881 in Fort Thomas, Arisona Territory the son of William D. Ganzhorn and Ida A. His mother died in December 1882, when Jack was almost two years old.

Early Years
Jack Ganzhorn spent his early years living near Tombstone, Arizona. When the Battleship Maine was fired upon in February 1898, Ganzhorn joined the U.S. Navy during the Spanish–American War, from February 1898 to March 1899, and was wounded in the left foot.

Filmography
 Thorobred, 1922 – as Blackie Wells
 The Iron Horse, 1924 – as Thomas C. Durant (uncredited)
 Fightin' Odds, 1925 – as Dave Ormsby
 Thank You, 1925 – as Gossiping Man (uncredited)
 Hawk of the Hills, 1927 – as Henry Selby
 The Apache Raider (1928) – as Breed Artwell
 The Valley of Hunted Men (1928) – as Frenchy Durant
 Hawk of the Hills, 1929 – as Henry Selby

Publications
 I've Killed Men, by Jack Ganzhorn, The Devin-Adair Company, 1959
 Damnation Ranch, by Jack Ganzhorn, The Golden West Magazine, September 1929
 Gamblers Guns, by Jack Ganzhorn, Super Western, December 1937
 Leaden Justice, by Jack Ganzhorn, Wild West Stories Magazine, November 1935
 The Worm, by Jack Ganzhorn, Real Western Stories, February 1956
 Lone Star Western, by Jack Ganzhorn, (Australia) #12, 1950s

References

External links
  The Western & Frontier Fiction Magazine Index, Jack Ganzhorn
  Jack Ganzhorn (1881–1956) at Imdb
  Prairie Gunsmoke, 1942, story by Jack Ganzhorn, starring Tex Ritter
 

Western (genre) writers
1881 births
1956 deaths
Male Western (genre) film actors